The Shanghai Medical College, Fudan University, formerly the independent Shanghai Medical University (SHMU), is one of the oldest and most prestigious medical schools in China. Clinical medicine of the Shanghai Medical College of Fudan University is consistently ranked among the top three medical schools in China and #45 globally by Times Higher Education World University Rankings as of 2022. Its "Clinical Medicine" also ranked #73 globally by the U.S. News & World Report globally. 

Established in 1927, Shanghai Medical University was merged into Fudan University in April 2000 to become its medical school. On July 27, 2001, Shanghai Medical College of Fudan University was established, with Professor Wang Weiping as its first dean, and the original site of Shanghai Medical University was then designated as the Fenglin Campus of Fudan University.

Location 
The college is located to the east of Xujiahui, in Xuhui District, Shanghai. It is located adjacent to Zhaojiabang Road Station, served by Shanghai Metro Lines 7 and 9.

History 

 1927 The Medical College of Shanghai was founded, comprising part of National Fourth Zhongshan University whose main campus was in Nanjing, when Jiangsu Medical University originated in 1902 in Suzhou was merged into the university, and the degree of Doctor of Medicine was awarded to qualified graduates who completed study of 2 years in Nanjing and 5 years in Shanghai campus as designed. It was the first medical school established by a national university in China. The founding figures include a number of distinguished Chinese medical experts. In the beginning the Shanghai medical college rented Huashan Hospital as its teaching hospital which was under deficit, and in 1929, under the director Yan Fuqing, the hospital turned losses into gains. In 1930 when Yan Fuqing was the college dean, Shanghai Medical Center (Zhongshan Hospital) was initiated, and Zhongshan Hospital was opened in 1937.
 1928 Fourth Zhongshan University was renamed Jiangsu University, and in May of the same year was again renamed to National Central University (which itself was to be renamed Nanjing University in 1949.)
 1932 National Central University Medical College became an independent institution under the name of National Shanghai Medical College.
 1937 Moved to Kunming, Yunnan because of the Second Sino-Japanese War.
 1940 Relocated to Chongqing.
 1946 Returned to Shanghai after the end of the war.
 1952 Renamed Shanghai First Medical College.
 1959 Designated by the state government as one of the sixteen national key institutions of higher education in China.
 1985 Named Shanghai Medical University.
 2000 Merged with Fudan University.
 2001 Established as Fudan University Shanghai Medical College (aka Medical Center of Fudan University).

Campus Reconstruction 
In July 2014, Shanghai Medical College's campus began a 2-year large-scale construction project and was open for use in late 2017. New facilities include new student residential colleges with residential towers, food services, and activity space, two research complexes, an indoor swimming center with rooftop soccer field, and a 20-story library tower, which was built with ￥100 million CNY (US$16.1 million) of support from Powerlong Group Development Co. Ltd. and Shanghai Haosheng Investment Group. The campus now has campus-wide high-speed Wi-Fi and 24-hour study spaces for students and staff.

Education and research 
Today, the college has 27 departments in the basic medical sciences and clinical medicine, 20 national key disciplines, 1 national key laboratory, 8 Project 211 key disciplines, 9 key laboratories under the supervision of the Ministry of Education or the Ministry of Health of the People's Republic of China, 2 municipal key disciplines and 8 Shanghai Clinic Medical Centers. It has 4 research stations that offer postdoctoral fellowships, 29 doctoral programs and 36 master programs.

The college offers undergraduate programs in Clinical Medicine, Basic Medicine and Forensic Medicine. The Clinical Medicine programs include a standard 5-year program offering the Bachelor of Medicine degree, a six-year program offering the Bachelor of Medicine, Bachelor of Surgery degree, and an eight-year program offering the Doctor of Medicine degree.

As a part of Fudan University, the college offers interdisciplinary programs while featuring its focus in medicine and clinical study. The college faculty includes a number of well-known experts and professors who are highly respected for their academic achievements and medical skills. Among them are 2 members of the Chinese Academy of Sciences, 4 members of the Chinese Academy of Engineering, 10 Cheung Kong Distinguished Professor of the Ministry of Education of China, and 10 faculties funded by the National Outstanding Youth Foundation. At present, the college has 249 PhD advisors and 249 master advisors.

The college has established cooperative relations and exchange programs with numerous medical schools throughout the world, including those of Harvard University, Columbia University, University of Sydney, University of British Columbia, Umeå University, Osaka University, University of Hong Kong, and Chinese University of Hong Kong.

The Ministry of Education of China has approved Fudan University as one of the thirty qualified universities in China to enroll international students in both its English-taught and Chinese-taught programs of medicine.

Academic departments

Basic medicine
Department of Anatomy and Histo-embryology
Department of Cellular and Genetic Medicine
Department of Biochemistry and Molecular Biology
Department of Microbiology and Parasitology
Department of Immunology
Department of Physiology and Pathophysiology
Department of Pathology
Department of Pharmacology
Department of Forensic Medicine

Clinical specialties
Department of Internal Medicine
Department of Surgery
Department of Pediatrics
Department of Obstetrics and Gynecology
Department of Neurology
Department of Dermatology and Venereal Disease
Department of Ophthalmology
Department of Otolaryngology
Department of Oncology
Department of Mental Medicine
Department of Medical Imaging
Department of Rehabilitative and Sports Medicine
Department of Anesthesiology
Department of Integrated Traditional Chinese Medicine and Western Medicine
Department of Clinical Diagnostics
Department of Stomatology
Department of Plastic Surgery
Department of Family Medicine

Laboratories

Basic sciences
State Key Laboratory of Medical Neurobiology
Key Laboratory of Medical Molecular Virology, Ministry of Education and Health
Key Laboratory of Molecular Medicine, Ministry of Education and Health
Laboratory of Molecular Genetics
Gene Research Center
Electron Microscopy Laboratory
Clinical Skills Learning Center

Clinical research
Key Laboratory of Clinical Pharmacology of Antibiotics, Ministry of Health
Key Laboratory of Hearing Medicine, Ministry of Health
Key Laboratory of Viral Heart Diseases, Ministry of Health
Key Laboratory of Neonatal Diseases, Ministry of Health
Key Laboratory of Hand Function Reconstruction, Ministry of Health
Key Laboratory of Complex Carbohydrates, Ministry of Health
Key Laboratory of Myopia, Ministry of Health

Fudan University Journal of Medical Sciences
The Fudan University Journal of Medical Sciences is a comprehensive national key medical journal managed by Fudan University under the supervision of the Ministry of Education of China, and is distributed domestically and internationally. Formerly known as the Journal of Shanghai Medical University, it was founded in June 1956. It mainly publishes original articles in the area of basic medicine, clinical medicine, pharmacology and preventive medicine, but it also covers a wide variety of columns including reviews, case reports, methodologies and brief communications.

The journal is indexed in internationally renowned abstracts services, e.g. American-based Chemical Abstracts Service (CA) and Biological Abstracts (BA), Amsterdam-based EMBASE or Excerpta Medica (EM), Russia-based Abstracts Journal, and various domestic medical abstracts and academic journal full-text databases.

Teaching hospitals 
The college has 11 affiliated teaching hospitals which serve as the school's teaching and internship bases.
Zhongshan Hospital
Huashan Hospital
Children's Hospital of Fudan University
Red House Hospital (Obstetrics and Gynecology Hospital)
Eye and ENT Hospital of Fudan University
Shanghai Cancer Center
Huadong Hospital
Shanghai Public Health Clinical Center
Shanghai Fifth People's Hospital
Jinshan Hospital
Pudong Hospital

Notable alumni

Notes

References 

Medical schools in China
Universities and colleges in Shanghai
Xuhui District
1927 establishments in China
Fudan University